Pilsbryspira atramentosa is a species of sea snail, a marine gastropod mollusk in the family Pseudomelatomidae, the turrids and allies.

Description
The length of the shell varies between 9 mm and 17 mm.

Distribution
This species occurs in the Pacific Ocean Ocean between Costa Rica and Panama

References

 Smith E.A. (1882). Diagnoses of new species of Pleurotomidae in the British Museum. Annals and Magazine of Natural History. ser. 5, 10: 206-218

External links
 H. A. Pilsbry and H. N. Lowe, West Mexican and Central American Mollusks Collected by H. N. Lowe, 1929-31; Proceedings of the Academy of Natural Sciences of Philadelphia Vol. 84 (1932), pp. 33-144
 
 

atramentosa
Gastropods described in 1882